Glenn Drahn (born c. 1930) is a former American football player and coach. He was selected by the Philadelphia Eagles in the 1951 NFL Draft. After serving as a high school coach in Belle Plaine, Iowa, Drahn was the head football coach at Coe College in Cedar Rapids, Iowa from 1960 to 1970, compiling  a record of 49–39–2. He was also the head baseball coach at Coe from 1967 to 1970, tallying a mark of 18–33.

References

Year of birth missing (living people)
Living people
American football quarterbacks
Coe Kohawks baseball coaches
Coe Kohawks football coaches
Iowa Hawkeyes football players
High school football coaches in Iowa
People from Monona County, Iowa
Players of American football from Iowa